Wenceslao Moguel Herrera (c. 1890 – 29 July 1976), known in the press as El Fusilado (Spanish: "The Shot One"), was a Mexican soldier under Pancho Villa who was captured on March 18, 1915 during the Mexican Revolution, and survived execution by firing squad. 

He was sentenced to death without a trial, and was shot 8–9 times in the body.

Stories differ as to how he survived. Some sources suggest that he was rescued:

Others state that he escaped on his own and received care afterwards:

Moguel appeared on the Ripley's Believe it or Not radio show on July 16, 1937.

Notes

References

Bibliography
 Wenceslao Moguel. El milagro del Santo de Halachó, o Historia de un Fusilado. – Merida, 1967. – 186 pp.

1890s births
1970s deaths
People of the Mexican Revolution
Prisoners sentenced to death by Mexico
Execution survivors